Aurelia Napoleon "Bunny" Dame (December 6, 1913 – April 14, 2006) was a Canadian professional ice hockey forward who played 34 games in the National Hockey League for the Montreal Canadiens. He played for the Trail Smoke Eaters from 1936 to 1941, and with them representing Canada at the 1939 World Ice Hockey Championships, where he scored 8 goals in 7 games, winning the gold medal. Dame was born in St. Albert, Alberta.

External links
Legends of Hockey bio

Notice of death

1913 births
2006 deaths
Canadian ice hockey forwards
Ice hockey people from Alberta
Montreal Canadiens players
Sportspeople from St. Albert, Alberta